The Alternate Express is a 1989 album by the Art Ensemble of Chicago released on the Japanese DIW label. It features performances by Lester Bowie, Joseph Jarman, Roscoe Mitchell, Malachi Favors Maghostut and Don Moye.

Reception
The Allmusic review by Brian Olewnick describes the album as "only occasionally rising to the level of excitement and inspiration evinced on recordings from the late '60s and early '70s".

Track listing 
 "Whatever Happens" (Bowie) - 9:59
 "And There Was Peace" (Mitchell) - 5:28
 "Imaginary Situations" (Art Ensemble of Chicago) - 9:28
 "Kush" (Favors, Moye) - 21:40
 "The Alternate Express" (Mitchell) - 4:25
 Recorded January 1989 in Chicago

Personnel 
 Lester Bowie: trumpet, fluegelhorn
 Malachi Favors Maghostut: bass, percussion instruments
 Joseph Jarman: saxophones, clarinets, percussion instruments
 Roscoe Mitchell: saxophones, clarinets, flute, percussion instruments
 Don Moye: drums, percussion

References 

1989 albums
DIW Records albums
Art Ensemble of Chicago albums